Mange tout (French for "eat all") or mangetout may refer to:

Sugar peas or edible-pod peas including:
 Snap pea 
 Snow pea
Mange Tout, 1984 album by Blancmange
 Monsieur Mangetout (Michel Lotito, 1950–2007), French entertainer